G. chinensis  may refer to:
 Gemmingia chinensis, a synonym for Iris domestica, the blackberry lily, leopard flower or leopard lily, an ornamental plant species
 Gyraulus chinensis, a freshwater snail species

See also
 Chinensis (disambiguation)